Đặng Nhật Minh (b. Huế, Vietnam, 1938) is one of Vietnam's foremost film directors. He began making documentary films around 1965 and is the first Vietnamese person to be awarded the Nikkei Asia Prize for Culture, in 1999. His films have won several prizes at international film festivals.

He is the former General Secretary of the Vietnam Cinema Association.

Biography

Early life 
Dang Nhat Minh was born in Hue, Vietnam in 1938. His father, Đặng Văn Ngữ, was a medical doctor whose research led him to work frequently abroad, such as in Japan from 1943-1950. Because of this Minh and his siblings were largely raised by his mother.

In 1950, Minh was sent by the Vietnamese Communist Party(VCP) to a Chinese military school. In his autobiography he describes this period of his education as filled with brainwashing and self censorship. After four years of schooling in China, the VCP sent him to study Russian in the USSR so that he could become an interpreter. His entire education was decided for him ahead of time by the Communist Party.

His first work within cinema was translating Russian films made in the USSR to Vietnamese. During this time, Minh also learnt more about the inner workings of cinema production, something credited to his mastery of Russian and his long exposure to Russian film. When his dad died during the Vietnam war 1967 he was given party related career favours which combined with his auto-dictation allowed him to become a director. His first film was a documentary about geology.

Career

Inspiration/Influence 
A strong influence on Minh’s work as a filmmaker was provided by his uncle Nguyễn Hồng Phong. In his autobiography, he mentions(p. 41-42):“Through literature, poetry, metaphors, pop songs, the study of pictorial art, my uncle taught me to think in images, a quality indispensable for a filmmaker. […] To do one’s job well, a film director cannot be satisfied with simply mastering some techniques. What matters the most for this profession is one’s personal worldview and aesthetic. Without these, the director is just a skilful craftsman. Since the beginning of my career till this day, all that I have brought to cinema, I owe it to what my uncle taught me. He allowed me to forge my own vision of the world which gave birth to my creations.”As part of a generation that lived through the difficult war situation, becoming a filmmaker and being able to make films is something out of the ordinary. Minh considers his being able to make films “a miracle” and largely credits it to luck. He also believes that it is with the support of his ancestors that has allowed him to make films.

Filmic works 
Dang Nhat Minh started his career in film by making documentaries with topics ranging from geography, ethnography to history. Notable works during this time includes: Following the Geologists (Theo chân những người địa chất, 1965), Ha Bac My Hometown (Hà Bắc quê hương, 1967), May - Faces (Tháng 5 - Những gương mặt, 1975), Nguyen Trai (Nguyễn Trãi, 1980).

As a documentarist, he became the government’s observer and reporter of historical events in Vietnam. For instance, in 1975 the government sent him as a representative to Saigon during the last days of the liberation, documenting the event in film.

He started his feature film career by adapting existing plays, generating such works as Stars on the Sea (Những ngôi sao biển, 1977), A Year-end Rainy Day (Ngày mưa cuối năm, 1980).

Around 1980, he wrote a short story named "The Town Within Reach." It was published in the Văn Nghệ (Literature and Arts) magazine and won a prize, making him consider giving up on filmmaking to become a writer. However, not long after that, he met a scholar and close friend of his uncle Nguyen Hong Phong. This person encouraged him to make a film out of his own story. He made the film "The Town Within Reach" in 1983, marking the beginning of his filmography. 

In his autobiography, he notes: "So I determined my direction: I only make films that I myself write the script, talk about issues that interest me, move me. Having found a way to exist in the world of cinema, I don't think about giving up on it anymore."

His works are dense with political arguments, in which the view in one film may conflict with that of the other. Usually placing a woman at the centre of the story, Dang Nhat Minh closely traced Vietnamese historical struggles through the Sino-Vietnamese War (The Town Within Reach - 1983), the post-war period (When The Tenth Month Comes - 1984, The Girl on the River - 1987), the Đổi Mới economic reforms (The Return - 1994), and came back to one of the darkest phases in the post-independence Vietnam - The 1950s land reform in North Vietnam (The Guava Season - 2000). Except for explicit propaganda movies such as Miss Nhung, Don't Burn, and Hanoi: Winter 1946, there is often one unifying theme that runs through most of his films: Betrayal.

He wants to let the world discover the life of these people in times of war as well as in times of peace after the reunification, filming bourgeois as well as peasants. He often centres his stories around women, whose memories and experiences in times of conflict are often forgotten. 

Minh occasionally focuses on historical figures, such as the scholar and politician Nguyễn Trãi, a film ordered by the department of cinema in 1980 or the president Hô Chi Minh in the political documentary Hanoi: Winter 1946.

Apart from his film-making activities, Minh also had responsibilities as the elected General Secretary of the Vietnam Film Association. According to his autobiography, he especially had difficulties in having sufficient political say and being heard by the government.

He was the former General Secretary of the Vietnam Film Association for more than 10 years (1989-2000) where he constantly received a strong mandate through polling from members. However, he withdrew from his position as he disliked the change in politics of the association, stating that he was glad to leave and pleased to see that he had not lost himself over the years.

On the international stage 
He received numerous international awards and was part of the jury of numerous festivals such as the Fukuoka festival and Locarno festival. Some of his films have also been funded by foreign countries, including Great Britain and Japan, a proof of the filmmaker's fame. These opportunities have enabled him more freedom in writing his screenplay. 

In his autobiography however, Minh notes a contradiction between the internationally constructed vision of him as head of Vietnamese cinema and symbol of Doi Moi, and his controversial image in Vietnam.

Censorship 
Dang Nhat Minh experienced censorship in the production of all his films. Before shooting any film, he had to submit the screenplay to authorities to gain their approval. He must often cut out parts, modify the plot and characters, sometimes for obscure reasons. Some of his scripts were even rejected without any reason. In his autobiography, Dang Nhat Minh talks about how censorship is a real barrier to the conditions of film production. After having one of his first films banned from shooting, he asked the artistic director of the film studio about the definition of a socialist screenplay. The answer was that "the ending must be happy," and it must sing praises of harmony and socialism.

Since all his films were funded by the government (except for "Nostalgia for the Countryside," which was his first film to be allowed to choose the funding sources), Dang Nhat Minh had to find a way to work within the ideological constraints to speak his mind about the human condition in Vietnamese society.

His early films were decided to be black and white by the director of Vietnam Feature Film Studio. As he recalled, Vietnam-produced films were divided into two groups: export-oriented films and films for the domestic market. Export-oriented films were prioritised to be colour, under the condition that they must show off a face of Vietnam that has bright cities, fashions, hotels and restaurants, industrial productivity, heroic fighting, etc. However, he feels lucky that his screenplays were placed on the list for black and white film funding.

One example is the film "When The Tenth Month Comes." After authorities reviewed the screenplay numerous times, they forewarned Dang Nhat Minh that he would be allowed to make the film under the condition that the widow whose husband died in the war must not fall in love with the village's teacher. Dang Nhat Minh agreed but still tried to imply it in the film. The film screening for authorities went smoothly; however, they raised another concern for a scene that looked "superstitious." Dang Nhat Minh defended the scene, insisting that it was an essential characteristic of Vietnamese culture. The film was reviewed 13 times in total, making Dang Nhat Minh feel like he was a criminal dragged to trials after trials.At last, the scene was allowed to be screened but had to be shortened.

Another example was The Girl On The River (1987). Heavily criticised by a high-ranked official in the Vietnamese government, it was only screened at one festival before disappearing in official screenings in Vietnam.

Filmography

Documentary

Film

Awards & Recognition 
Dang Nhat Minh was awarded the title of Merited Artist in 1988, People's Artist in 1993, and the First Class Labor Order in 1998 by the Vietnamese Government. By 1999, he had received the Nikkei Asia Prize of "Culture and Community" for his contributions to Asian cinema. In South Korea, he was honored twice with the "Lifetime Achievement Award for Outstanding tribute to Asian cinema" and the Kim Daejung Peace Film Award at Gwangju International Film Festival in 2005 and 2013. He also became the first Vietnamese film director to win a Lifetime Achievement Award at a foreign film festival. In 2007, he was awarded the Hồ Chí Minh Prize for his works: The Town Is Within the Range, When the Tenth Month Comes, Hanoi: Winter 1946 and The Guava Season. In 2010, he became the first Vietnamese director to be honored by the Academy of Motion Picture Arts and Sciences for his dedication to film. And in 2016, he was awarded the Licorne d'Or for his entire film career at the Amiens International Film Festival.

On March 31, 2022 at the French Embassy in Hanoi, Dang Nhat Minh was awarded the Ordre des Arts et des Lettres by ambassador Nicolas Warnery, representative of the French Ministry of Culture, in recognition of his contributions to enhancing cultural understanding between the two countries of Vietnam and France. Ambassador Nicolas Warnery affirmed that France recognized the contributions of Dang Nhat Minh not only in his humanitarian works screened in France, cooperative films such as Spring or the cinema association between the two countries during his time as general secretary of the Cinema Association, but also during his time as an interpreter for French film crews to Vietnam.

Awards and nominations

Notes

Source 
 Vietnamese

 
 
 
 
 
 
 
 
 
 
 
 
 
 
 

 English

 
 
 
 
 
 
 
 
 
 
 
 
 
 
 
 
 
 
 
 
 
 
 
 
 
 
 
 
 
 
 

 Other language

External links
 
Đặng Nhật Minh page

1938 births
Living people
Vietnamese film directors
People from Huế
Winners of the Nikkei Asia Prize